Mary Riley may refer to:

 Janet Mary Riley (1915–2008), American civil rights activist and law professor
 Mary Gine Riley (1883–1939), American painter
 Mary V. Riley (1908–1987), Apache tribal council member

See also
 Mary Reilly (disambiguation)